Dilnot is a surname. Notable people with the surname include:

Andrew Dilnot (born 1960), Welsh economist and broadcaster
Frank Dilnot (1875–1946), English author and journalist
Giles Dilnot (born 1971), British television presenter
Peter Dilnot (born 1952), Australian rules footballer